Marian Sandu (born 5 May 1972 in Ploieşti, Prahova, Romania) is a retired Romanian wrestler and Olympic champion in Greco-Roman wrestling.

Sandu has competed in four Olympics, from 1992 to 2004. At the 1992 Summer Olympics in Barcelona he was ranked sixth in Greco-Roman wrestling, the bantamweight class.

References

External links
 

1972 births
Living people
Olympic wrestlers of Romania
Wrestlers at the 1992 Summer Olympics
Wrestlers at the 1996 Summer Olympics
Wrestlers at the 2000 Summer Olympics
Romanian male sport wrestlers
Wrestlers at the 2004 Summer Olympics
World Wrestling Championships medalists
European Wrestling Champions
Sportspeople from Ploiești